Yahiya Emerick is a former president of the Islamic Foundation of North America, vice-principal at an Islamic school, and a Muslim author. He has written several published articles and works of fiction.

Life
Emerick was born into an American Protestant Christian family, and converted to Islam in 1989 while a freshman at Michigan State University. He later obtained a graduate degree in history.

Emerick has served as a Muslim lecturer, educator, prayer leader, and author. He founded Amirah Publishing in 1992, in order to further his goal of publishing American-oriented literature on Islam. Emerick's Complete Idiot's Guide to Understanding Islam has been distributed worldwide by Alpha Books. From 1998 until 2008 his books were all published by Noorart Inc.

Books
 Complete Idiot's Guide to Understanding Islam
 Critical Lives: Muhammad
 Learning About Islam
 Complete Idiot's Guide to Rumi Meditations
 The Meaning of the Holy Qur'an in Today's English
 My First Book About Islam
 What Islam is All About
 The Seafaring Beggar and Other Stories
 How to Tell Others About Islam
 Ahmad Deen and the Curse of the Aztec Warrior
 Ahmad Deen and the Jinn at Shaolin
 Layla Deen and the Case of the Ramadan Rogue
 The Holy Qur'an for School Children
 Muslim Youth Speak
 Color and Learn Salah
 In the Path of the Holy Prophet
 Test Masters for What Islam is All About
 Test Masters for Learning About Islam
 My First Book about Eman
 Full Circle: Story and Coloring Book
 Isabella: a Girl of Muslim Spain
 Layla Deen and the Popularity Contest

References

Year of birth missing (living people)
Living people
American religious writers
American male short story writers
American Muslims
American former Protestants
Converts to Islam from Protestantism
Michigan State University alumni
Islamic fiction writers
Translators of the Quran into English
Male essayists
20th-century American short story writers
20th-century American essayists
20th-century American translators
21st-century American short story writers
21st-century American translators
21st-century American essayists
20th-century American male writers
21st-century American male writers
American male non-fiction writers